Michael Kühn (born 6 May 1963) is a retired German football midfielder.

References

External links
 

1963 births
Living people
German footballers
Bundesliga players
2. Bundesliga players
VfL Bochum players
VfL Bochum II players
Sportspeople from Bochum
Association football midfielders
Footballers from North Rhine-Westphalia